Eupoa prima is a species of jumping spider from Vietnam. Described in 1985, it was for some time the only described species in the genus Eupoa; however, since 1997 six new species have been reported.

Description
Both sexes are one to two millimeters long. The carapace is grey-brown, lighter in the middle, and the eyes are surrounded black. The male opisthosoma is black-brown with small elongate light transverse patches, the female grey-brown with much larger patches. The legs are yellowish-grey. It resembles the not closely related Neon.

Footnotes

References
  (2000): An Introduction to the Spiders of South East Asia. Malaysian Nature Society, Kuala Lumpur.
  (2007): The world spider catalog, version 8.0. American Museum of Natural History.

Salticidae
Arthropods of Vietnam
Spiders of Asia
Spiders described in 1985